Major General Cameron Bethel Ware, DSO, CD, (August 9, 1913 – January 21, 1999) was a Major General in the Canadian Forces. He joined the Princess Patricia's Canadian Light Infantry Regiment on graduation from RMC in Kingston, Ontario in 1935 (student #2253).

Career
On the outbreak of war in 1939, he was serving on attachment to the British Army. He rejoined Princess Patricia's Canadian Light Infantry in 1940 as a Major and was appointed second in command in 1941. He led the battalion in the invasion of Italy and in all operations up to the end of the Battle of Liri Valley in June 1944.  On leaving the Princess Patricia's Canadian Light Infantry he was promoted to Colonel and was given command of the Regiment at Camp MacDonald. In September, 1947, he proceeded to staff college and thereafter received a senior staff appointment. On the outbreak of the Korean War he took command of the Canadian Military Mission to the Far East. In 1952, he became Director General of Military training. In 1952, he was appointed Commandant of the Services College at Royal Roads Military College. In 1955, he became Director General of Military Training. He was then appointed Commander, 1 Canadian Infantry Brigade Group in Germany. Promoted to Major-General in 1962, he was appointed Commandant, National Defence College in Kingston, Ontario in 1966 until his retirement. Major-General Ware was appointed Colonel of the Regiment, Princess Patricia's Canadian Light Infantry on 13 September 1959. He retired from the Canadian Forces in September, 1966. Major-General Ware relinquished the appointment of Colonel of the Regiment on 21 April 1977. Major General Ware died 21 January 1999.

Honours
He was Mentioned in Despatches 30 October 1943 and awarded the DSO during the battle of the Moro River 5 December 1943.

Legacy
The Major General Cameron Bethel Ware fonds are in the Princess Patricia's Canadian Light Infantry Regimental Museum and Archives.

References

4237 Dr. Adrian Preston & Peter Dennis (Edited) "Swords and Covenants" Rowman And Littlefield, London. Croom Helm. 1976.
H16511 Dr. Richard Arthur Preston "Canada's RMC - A History of Royal Military College" Second Edition 1982
H16511 Dr. Richard Preston "R.M.C. and Kingston: The effect of imperial and military influences on a Canadian community" 1968 Kingston, Ontario.
H1877 R. Guy C. Smith (editor) "As You Were! Ex-Cadets Remember". In 2 Volumes. Volume I: 1876-1918. Volume II: 1919-1984. RMC. Kingston, Ontario. The R.M.C. Club of Canada. 1984

External links
 Princess Patricia's Canadian Light Infantry Regimental Manual
 Cameron Bethel Ware Fonds

1911 births
1999 deaths
Canadian military personnel from Ontario
Royal Military College of Canada alumni
Canadian military personnel of the Korean War
Canadian Army personnel of World War II
Princess Patricia's Canadian Light Infantry officers
Canadian generals
Canadian Companions of the Distinguished Service Order